The 1980 Avon Championships of Boston  was a women's tennis tournament played on indoor carpet courts at the Boston University Walter Brown Arena in Boston, Massachusetts in the United States that was part of the 1980 Avon Championships circuit. It was the seventh edition of the tournament and was held from Monday, March 10 through Sunday March 16, 1980. First-seeded Tracy Austin won the singles title and earned $24,000 first-prize money.

Finals

Singles
 Tracy Austin defeated  Virginia Wade 6–2, 6–1
 It was Austin's 3rd title of the year and the 13th of her career.

Doubles
 Rosie Casals /  Wendy Turnbull defeated  Billie Jean King /  Ilana Kloss 6–4, 7–6(7–4)

Prize money

Notes

References

External links
 Women's Tennis Association (WTA) tournament edition details
 International Tennis Federation (ITF) tournament edition details

Avon Championships of Boston
Virginia Slims of Boston
Avon Championships
Virgin